Nakia Griffin-Stewart (born November 12, 1996) is an American football tight end who is a free agent. He played college football for the Rutgers Scarlet Knights and the Pitt Panthers. Nakia added the name Stewart to his last name in honor of his step-father in 2015 at the beginning of his college football career. 

Raised in Tenafly, New Jersey, Griffin-Stewart played prep football at Tenafly High School.

Professional career

Minnesota Vikings
Griffin-Stewart was signed by the Minnesota Vikings as an undrafted free agent on April 28, 2020. He was waived by the Vikings during final roster cuts on September 5, 2020.

Green Bay Packers
Griffin-Stewart was signed to the Green Bay Packers' practice squad on September 23, 2020. He was waived on November 3, 2020.

New York Giants
Griffin-Stewart was signed to the New York Giants' practice squad on November 24, 2020. He was released from the practice squad on December 8, 2020. Griffin-Stewart signed a reserve/future contract with the Giants on January 11, 2021. He was waived at the end of the preseason on August 31, 2021.

Kansas City Chiefs
Griffin-Stewart signed by the Kansas City Chiefs to their practice squad on November 3, 2021. He was released on November 9, but was re-signed on November 29. Griffin-Stewart was elevated to the active roster on December 26, 2021, for the team's Week 16 game against the Pittsburgh Steelers and made his NFL debut in the game. He was released on January 18, 2022. He signed a reserve/future contract with the Chiefs on February 7, 2022. He was waived on May 5, 2022.

Cleveland Browns
On May 24, 2022, Griffin-Stewart signed with the Cleveland Browns. He was waived by the Browns on August 30, 2022.

Indianapolis Colts
On September 20, 2022, Griffin-Stewart was signed to the Indianapolis Colts practice squad. He was released on October 17.

References

External links
Rutgers Scarlet Knights bio
Pittsburgh Panthers bio
Kansas City Chiefs bio

1996 births
Living people
American football tight ends
Rutgers Scarlet Knights football players
Pittsburgh Panthers football players
Kansas City Chiefs players
Minnesota Vikings players
New York Giants players
Green Bay Packers players
Cleveland Browns players
Indianapolis Colts players
People from Tenafly, New Jersey
Players of American football from New Jersey
Sportspeople from Bergen County, New Jersey
Tenafly High School alumni